Viroinformatics is an amalgamation of virology with bioinformatics, involving the application of information and communication technology in various aspects of viral research. 
Currently there are more than 100 web servers and databases harboring knowledge regarding different viruses as well as distinct applications concerning diversity analysis, viral recombination, RNAi studies, drug design, protein–protein interaction, structural analysis etc.

References

External links
Viral bioinformatics
VBRC
ViPR
ViralZone
Viral bioinformatics: introduction
Viral genomics and bioinformatics

Bioinformatics
Computational biology
Virology
Computational fields of study